Nerita orbignyana is a species of sea snail with an operculum, a marine gastropod mollusk in the family Neritidae, the nerites.

References

Neritidae
Gastropods described in 1842
Taxobox binomials not recognized by IUCN